The lemon-browed flycatcher (Conopias cinchoneti) is a species of bird in the family Tyrannidae.
It is found in Bolivia, Colombia, Ecuador, Peru, and Venezuela.
Its natural habitat is subtropical or tropical moist montane forests.

Description 
The bird is similar to Yellow-throated flycatcher, but it has a yellow superciliary. This species ranges at higher elevations on the east slope of the andes. It is 6.2 inches in length.

References

lemon-browed flycatcher
Birds of the Northern Andes
lemon-browed flycatcher
Taxonomy articles created by Polbot